Rotary Botanical Gardens is a non-profit  botanical garden located in Janesville, Wisconsin that is open to the public.

Overview
The 20-acre site contains a number of themed gardens, including Japanese, Scottish, French formal, Italian, and English cottage gardens. The Japanese garden borders a pond that is spanned by a red Japanese-styled bridge. A sunken garden is surrounded by limestone walls and perennial plantings. Its entrance is a Tudor-style stone arch that was once the entrance to the Parker Pen Company's world headquarters formerly located in Janesville. There are also less formal gardens, such as a fern and moss garden, and shade, prairie, and woodland gardens.

Rotary Botanical Gardens is a self-sustaining non-profit organization. With over 100,000 visitors annually, it is the most frequented tourist destination in Rock County. It is also a popular site for weddings and receptions. The popular Holiday Light Show event started in 1996 and features over 1 million lights and has become a regional attraction.

History

Rotary Botanical Gardens was established in 1988 by Janesville Rotary Clubs on the grounds of a defunct sand and gravel quarry. Owned by the city, the site was filled with debris and equipment. The city leased the site to the Rotarians, who began a multi-year cleanup project. After tons of rubbish were removed, gardens, walkways, benches, and gazebos were added. A ramshackle building on the property was rehabilitated and turned into a visitors' and environmental center. In 2002, meeting rooms, classrooms, and a gift shop were added and an addition to the Rath Environmental Center was completed in 2005.

Awards
 2012 - First-place winner in category III of the All-America Selections (AAS) Landscape Design Contest
 2013 - First-place winner in category III of the All-America Selections (AAS) Landscape Design Contest

See also 
 List of botanical gardens and arboretums in Wisconsin

References

External links 
Rotary Botanical Gardens website
Holiday Light Show website

Botanical gardens in Wisconsin
Janesville, Wisconsin
Rotary International